Nazikeda Kadın (meaning 'one of delicate manners'; born Princess Emine Marshan; 9 October 1866 – 4 April 1941), also nicknamed the Last Empress, was the first wife and chief consort of the last sultan, Mehmed VI of the Ottoman Empire.

Nazikeda was born Emine Hanım in Sukhumi to a family of Abkhazian principality. She was the daughter of Prince Hasan Bey Marshan and Fatma Horecan Hanım Aredba. She came to Istanbul in 1876, and married Prince Mehmed Vahdeddin later known as Mehmed VI, in 1885. She was his only wife for twenty years. She was the mother of three daughters, Münire Fenire Sultan, Fatma Ulviye Sultan, and Rukiye Sabiha Sultan.

After Mehmed's accession to the throne in 1918, she was given the title of 'Senior Kadın'. Mehmed was deposed in 1922, and sent into exile in 1924. Nazikeda followed him, and remained with him until his death in 1926. She spent her last years with her two daughters, Ulviye and Sabiha, and died at Cairo on 4 April 1941.

Early life
Nazikeda Kadın was born on 9 October 1866 in Sukhumi, Abkhazia. Born as Emine Marshan, she was  a member of Abkhazian princely family Marshan. Her father was Prince Hassan Bey Marshan (died 1877), the ruler of Tzebelda. Her mother was Princess Fatma Horecan Hanım Aredba, an Abkhazian. She had two elder brothers Prince Abdülkadir Bey, and Prince Mehmed Bey, and two younger sisters, Princess Naciye Hanım, and Princess Daryal Hanım (1870 – 1904).

In 1876, she had been brought to Istanbul as a young child, where her father entrusted her to the imperial harem together with her sister Daryal, and wetnurse Babuce Hanım (died 1910). She was then sent to Cemile Sultan's palace in Kandilli with her sisters and her cousins Amine, Rumeysa, Pakize, Fatma and Kamile, where her name according to the custom of the Ottoman court was changed to Nazikeda. She was educated very well and learned to play the piano; she also loved riding and Cemile Sultan allowed her to do it in the park of her palace.

Cemile Sultan's youngest daughter Fatma Hanımsultan, had tuberculosis and Nazikeda became her closest companion in 1880. Cemile raised her as if she was her own daughter. Her nanny remained with her even as she grew up, although she had been told that she could return to Caucasia if she wished. She, however, stayed with Nazikeda until her death. Nazikeda was beautiful, tall and curvy and had honey coloured eyes, long auburn hair, pale skin and slender waist.

Marriage
One day in 1884, when Mehmed was in his twenties, he visited his older sister Cemile Sultan at her palace at Kandilli. Here he saw Nazikeda, then seventeen years old, and fell in love with her. He asked his sister to give him Nazikeda in marriage, but Cemile flatly refused. She didn't want her sick daughter to be deprived of a companion, and at the same time that her brother would eventually take a second wife after Nazikeda, whom she considered as her own daughter.

However, one year after the prince's pleading who otherwise threatened never to marry Cemile acceded to her brother's demand, but on one condition that he would not take a second wife. He took the oath requested by his sister, and the marriage took place on 8 June 1885 in one of the palaces of Örtakoy. The marriage was consummated on 18 June. Mehmed was twenty four while Nazikeda was nineteen years old. After the marriage, the couple went to live in one of the palaces of Feriye, where they spent several years in a three-storey wooden mansion. This mansion was destroyed in a fire, and the couple later moved to the mansion in Çengelköy. She was loved and respected by all, even by King Farouk in exile. Her fashion style was appreciated even by Abdülhamid II himself, who once congratulated her for dressing her daughters so well.

Around the same time, her sister Daryal renamed Iryale was married to Şehzade Mehmed Selim, son of Sultan Abdul Hamid II. Her cousin Amine renamed also Nazikeda was married to Şehzade Yusuf Izzeddin, son of Sultan Abdulaziz.

The couple's first daughter Munire Fenire Sultan was born in 1888, and lived only a few weeks. She was followed by Fatma Ulviye Sultan born on 11 September 1892, and two years later, on 19 March 1894, by Rukiye Sabiha Sultan. After this third birth, Nazikeda was told by the doctors that she would not be able to bear other children.

On 30 May 1918, Nazikeda met with the Empress Zita of Bourbon-Parma in the harem of Yıldız Palace, when the latter visited Istanbul with her husband Emperor Charles I of Austria.

In the following years, Mehmed married other women to have a male heir, but all of his marriages were made with the consent of Nazikeda. Even though Mehmed's accession to the throne was unlikely, Nazikeda knew well that as a prince he had to have a male heir and, therefore, each time accepted his wish to remarry. By doing so Mehmed broke the vow he had made to his sister Cemile. Nonetheless, after his accession to the throne in 1918, he gave Nazikeda the title of "Senior Kadın", and his respect towards her never failed. Since both Mehmed VI's natural and adoptive mothers had died (Gülistu Kadın and Şayeste Hanim), Nazikeda became the most prominent female member of the dynasty and became known in Europe as the last Ottoman empress (usually in Europe this title was reserved for the sultan's mother, while his first consort was considered Queen, and subsequent consorts princesses or ladies). During the reign of her husband she patronised mosques and hospitals, she helped Circassians in economic difficulties and invited Russian aristocrats fleeing because of the Russian revolution to Yıldız Palace.

By 1916 Mehmed and Nazikeda's daughters had grown and reached the age of marriage. The elder daughter, Ulviye, was first to marry. The groom was Ismail Hakki Bey, the son of last grand vizier of the Ottoman Empire, Ahmed Tevfik Pasha. The wedding took place in a waterfront palace at Kuruçeşme on 10 August 1916, when Mehmed was a Crown Prince. The couple had a daughter Hümeyra Hanımsultan born on 4 June 1917. Ulviye divorced Ismail, and married Ali Haydar Bey, a member of the Germiyanoğlu family.

Her younger daughter, Sabiha and Şehzade Ömer Faruk, the son of Abdulmejid II, the last Caliph of the Ottoman Caliphate, were in love with each other. When Abdulmejid asked Sabiha's hand in marriage for his son, Mehmed flatly refused as there was no such thing as a marriage between cousins. Şehsuvar Hanım, the prince's mother called on Nazikeda, and succeeded in convincing her. The marriage took place on 5 December 1919, and the wedding reception took place four months later on 29 April 1920 at the Yıldız Palace. The couple had three daughters, Neslişah Sultan, Hanzade Sultan, and Necla Sultan.

Exile and widowhood
In 1922, Mehmed was deposed and exiled. She, together with other members of his family, was kept in house arrest at the Feriye Palace by order of the new parliament, where she lived through difficult times, often starving, she never complained, though, and always took care of the other women, until 10 March 1924, when they were sent into exile. Nazikeda along with Mehmed, moved to Sanremo. During their stay, Mehmed's daily routine was to visit Nazikeda's room, which was on the same floor as his apartment, to drink his morning coffee with her.

Following Mehmed's death in 1926, she moved to Monte Carlo, with her elder daughter Ulviye Sultan, her husband Ali Haydar Bey, and her daughter Hümeyra Hanımsultan. She also used to come for a stay at Nice with her younger daughter Sabiha Sultan and her husband Prince Ömer Faruk. A large room used to be assigned to her, which she shared with Şehzade Mehmed Ertuğrul, her stepson, whenever he came back from Grasse.

Nazikeda later moved to Alexandria with Ulviye, and after her grave illness there, Sabiha joined them in 1938. In 1940, she attended the wedding of her granddaughter, Neslişah Sultan and Prince Mohamed Abdel Moneim, son of Egypt's last khedive Abbas Hilmi II. She wore a purple dress with hotoz. She would never miss a prayer. In her last years, as she could not kneel down, she would pray on her chair.

Death
Nazikeda died at Maadi, Cairo, on 4 April 1941 at the age of seventy-four, and was buried in the mausoleum of Abbas Hilmi Pasha in the Abbasiye Cemetery.

Issue

In literature
Nazikeda is a minor character in T. Byram Karasu's  historical novel Of God and Madness: A Historical Novel (2007).

See also
Kadın (title)
Ottoman Imperial Harem
List of consorts of the Ottoman sultans
Leyla Achba
Rumeysa Aredba
Şahinde Hanım

References

Sources

External links

1866 births
1947 deaths
19th-century consorts of Ottoman sultans
Turkish people of Abkhazian descent
Exiles from the Ottoman Empire
Emigrants from the Ottoman Empire to Italy
Emigrants from the Ottoman Empire to France
Emigrants from the Ottoman Empire to Egypt
20th-century consorts of Ottoman sultans